Sidorkin is a rural locality (a khutor) in Alexeyevsky District, Belgorod Oblast, Russia. The population was 96 as of 2010. There are 2 streets.

Geography 
Sidorkin is located 10 km southwest of Alexeyevka (the district's administrative centre) by road. Grechanikov is the nearest rural locality.

References 

Rural localities in Alexeyevsky District, Belgorod Oblast
Biryuchensky Uyezd